Williams Suero Urban (November 7, 1966 – November 30, 1995) was a backup infielder in Major League Baseball, playing mainly as a second baseman from  through  for the Milwaukee Brewers. Listed at 5' 9", 175 lb., Suero batted and threw right-handed. He was born in Santo Domingo, Dominican Republic. 
 
In a two-season career, Suero was a .233 hitter (7-for-30) in 33 games, including four runs, a double, and one stolen base.

After the 1995 season, at the age of 29, Suero died in his native Santo Domingo when he lost control of his car and crashed into a utility pole.

See also
List of players from Dominican Republic in Major League Baseball

References

External links

1966 births
1995 deaths
Águilas Cibaeñas players
Buffalo Bisons (minor league) players
Carolina Mudcats players
Denver Zephyrs players
Dominican Republic expatriate baseball players in the United States
Dunedin Blue Jays players
Knoxville Blue Jays players

Major League Baseball players from the Dominican Republic
Major League Baseball second basemen
Medicine Hat Blue Jays players
Milwaukee Brewers players
Myrtle Beach Blue Jays players
New Orleans Zephyrs players
Road incident deaths in the Dominican Republic
St. Catharines Blue Jays players
Syracuse Chiefs players
Dominican Republic expatriate baseball players in Taiwan
Wei Chuan Dragons players
Dominican Republic expatriate baseball players in Canada